

Incumbents

References

 
Greece
2010s in Greece
Greece
Years of the 21st century in Greece